Marco Antonio Hernandez (born 1957) is the Chief United States district judge of the United States District Court for the District of Oregon.

Early life and education
Hernandez was born in Nogales, Arizona, in 1957 and is of Hispanic descent. He moved to Oregon at 17 and began work as a dishwasher, and then as a janitor before working his way through community college while working as a teacher's aide. Hernandez then moved on to a four-year school and received a Bachelor of Arts degree from Western Oregon State College (now known as Western Oregon University) in 1983. He then attended the University of Washington School of Law and earned his Juris Doctor in 1986.

Legal career
After law school he returned to Oregon where he spent three years working for Legal Aid Services of Oregon where he often represented farm workers. Following his time with legal aid, Hernandez the joined the Washington County District Attorney's office as a deputy prosecutor in 1989. Shortly before leaving office in January 1995, Governor Barbara Roberts appointed Hernandez to be Washington County Circuit Court Judge. In 2001, he allowed a claim for loss of companionship in a pet case to go to trial, the first time such a claim was allowed to go to trial in the United States. Hernandez served as Presiding Judge of the County's Circuit Court from 2002 to 2005. He won re-election to a new six-year term on the court in May 2008. He has also served as the judge for the county's Mental Health Court, and as presiding judge from 2002 until 2005.

Federal judicial nominations
In January 2008, Hernandez was one of three candidates recommended by a six-member judicial selection committee to replace Garr King on the United States District Court for the District of Oregon. President George W. Bush selected Hernandez to fill the vacancy on the District Court of Oregon and submitted his nomination on July 23, 2008. Senators Gordon H. Smith and Ron Wyden supported the nomination, but it was made with less than six months remaining in the Bush Presidency. The nomination was not acted upon by the 110th Congress and was thus returned. Republican Gordon Smith was narrowly defeated for re-election in 2008, and newly elected President Barack Obama restarted the judicial selection process for the District of Oregon. Democrat Ron Wyden recommended Hernandez in addition to five other candidates selected by a thirteen-member judicial selection committee. On July 14, 2010, Obama renominated Hernandez to replace Garr King. He is one of few people to be nominated to the federal bench by presidents from two different political parties. The Senate again failed to act on Hernandez's nomination, and President Obama nominated Hernandez again in January 2011. On February 7, 2011, the Senate unanimously confirmed Hernandez as the newest judge for the District of Oregon, and he received his commission on February 9. He became Chief Judge on December 23, 2019.

See also
 George W. Bush judicial appointment controversies
 List of Hispanic/Latino American jurists
 List of first minority male lawyers and judges in Oregon

References

External links

Oregon Health News article
Woman who called 911 for a date gets probation - KATU

1957 births
Living people
21st-century American judges
Hispanic and Latino American judges
Judges of the United States District Court for the District of Oregon
Oregon state court judges
People from Nogales, Arizona
People from Washington County, Oregon
United States district court judges appointed by Barack Obama
University of Washington School of Law alumni
Western Oregon University alumni